Ogallala High School is a secondary school located in Ogallala, Nebraska, United States.

About
OHS is part of the Ogallala Public School District.  The school takes in students from Ogallala Middle School and from West 5th, Progress, and Prairie View Elementary Schools.

Athletics
The Indians are members of the Southwest Conference.  They wear the colors of orange and black.

Notable alumni
Ed Husmann, former NFL player

References

Public high schools in Nebraska
Schools in Keith County, Nebraska